Louis Peter Skizas (born June 2, 1932) is an American former professional baseball outfielder and third baseman in Major League Baseball from 1956 through 1959 for the New York Yankees, Kansas City Athletics, Detroit Tigers and Chicago White Sox. He was born in Chicago, Illinois. Skizas batted and threw right-handed.
He was a volunteer hitting coach for University of Illinois Urbana-Champaign from 1980-1984.

Career
Skizas attended Crane High School in Chicago and was signed by the New York Yankees when he was 17. He made his Major League debut with the Yankees in a road game that the Yankees lost 7–3 to the Washington Senators on April 19, 1956.

Pinch-hitting in the fifth inning for pitcher Mickey McDermott, after leadoff hits by Elston Howard and Andy Carey put runners on second and third, Skizas singled to right field for the Yankees' first run of the game.

Skizas would get only six at-bats for New York. He was traded on June 14 of that season with teammate Eddie Robinson to the Kansas City Athletics for two players and cash. For the remainder of that season, Skizas appeared in 83 games for Kansas City and batted .316 with 11 home runs. He was a contact hitter who struck out just 17 times in 297 at-bats that season for the A's.

A 12-man trade between Kansas City and the Detroit Tigers was made on Nov. 20, 1957, in which Skizas went to Detroit along with teammates Billy Martin, Gus Zernial and the man he pinch-hit for in his first MLB at-bat, McDermott. In 1959, his last season in the majors, Skizas appeared in eight games for the Chicago White Sox, but did not play for them in the 1959 World Series.

After retiring from the Major Leagues he played minor league baseball in Central America and later was a Health Sciences teacher and Baseball Coach at Centennial High School in Champaign, Illinois.

References

External links

Lou Skizas at Baseball Library

1932 births
Living people
American expatriate baseball players in Mexico
American people of Greek descent
Baseball players from Illinois
Birmingham Barons players
Charleston Senators players
Chicago White Sox players
Denver Bears players
Detroit Tigers players
Havana Sugar Kings players
Indianapolis Indians players
Joplin Miners players
Kansas City Athletics players
Kansas City Blues (baseball) players
Macon Peaches players
Major League Baseball left fielders
Major League Baseball right fielders
Nashville Vols players
New York Yankees players
Norfolk Tars players
Richmond Virginians (minor league) players
Seattle Rainiers players
Tigres del México players
American expatriate baseball players in Cuba